Dachuna was a medieval virgin saint venerated in Cornwall. Probably British in origin, Dachuna is known from the list of resting-places of Hugh Candidus, authored around 1155. Dachuna, along with Medan and Credan, were allegedly associates of Saint Petroc, whom they rested alongside at the church of Bodmin.

Notes

References

 
 

Medieval Cornish saints